Brix is a puzzle video game for MS-DOS, developed by Michael Riedel and produced and published in 1991. An updated version with enhanced graphics and sound was published by Epic MegaGames in 1992. It is a clone of Taito's Puzznic, and thus bears strong graphical and some gameplay similarities to Plotting, also produced by Taito. An enhanced version, Brix 2 Deluxe, was released alongside the Epic MegaGames release, with dozens of new levels and a level editor.

Gameplay

Brix presents the player with an array of square puzzle pieces that can be moved horizontally across the playing area. Each piece has a symbol, and when two or more of the same type touch, they vanish. The goal is to make all the pieces disappear within the time limit. As the player progress through the game's 112 levels, Brix adds more challenging gameplay elements, including lasers, reversing gravity, teleporters, elevators, breakable barriers and acid.

Development
The game was written in over 17,000 lines of code in the C programming language with some routines in 80x86 assembly language.

Reception
Computer Gaming World in 1994 said that Brix was "somewhat more interesting than the average brain teaser". The magazine concluded that it was "an entertaining little exercise, although its potential for desktop-based addiction is not quite as high as its package would lead you to believe".

References

External links

Brix at RGB Classic Games, history and downloads

1991 video games
1992 video games
DOS games
DOS-only games
Epic Games games
Falling block puzzle games
MicroLeague games
Mobile games
Single-player video games
Video game clones
Video games developed in the United States